The 2022 Hawaii Rainbow Warriors volleyball team represents the University of Hawaiʻi at Mānoa (UH) in the 2022 NCAA Division I & II men's volleyball season. The Rainbow Warriors, led by 13th-year head coach Charlie Wade, play home games at Stan Sheriff Center on the UH campus in the Honolulu neighborhood of Mānoa. The Rainbow Warriors, members of the Big West Conference, were picked by Big West coaches to share the conference in its preseason poll with Long Beach State. The Rainbow Warriors enter the season the defending national champions after defeating BYU in the 2021 national championship. The national championship was Hawai'i's first men's volleyball national championship after they had to vacate the 2002 national championship.

Season highlights
Will be filled in as the season progresses.

Roster

Schedule
TV/Internet Streaming information:
All home games will be televised on Spectrum Sports. All conference road games will be streamed on ESPN+ or the respective schools streaming service.

 *-Indicates conference match.
 Times listed are Hawaii Time Zone.

Announcers for televised games
Loyola-Chicago: Kanoa Leahey & Ryan Tsuji
Loyola-Chicago: Kanoa Leahey & James Anastassiades
Edward Waters: Kanoa Leahey & Ryan Tsuji
Edward Waters: Kanoa Leahey & Ryan Tsuji
Ball State: Joel Godett & Amber Seaman
Ball State: Joel Godett & Kevin Owens
Fairleigh Dickinson: Kanoa Leahey & Bill Walton
Queens: Kanoa Leahey & Bill Walton
Stanford: Kanoa Leahey & Bill Walton
LIU: Kanoa Leahey & Ryan Tsuji
LIU: Kanoa Leahey & Ryan Tsuji
LIU: Kanoa Leahey & Ryan Tsuji
Lincoln Memorial: Kanoa Leahey & Ryan Tsuji
Lincoln Memorial: Kanoa Leahey & Ryan Tsuji
UC San Diego: Bryan Fenley & Ricci Luyties
UC San Diego: Bryan Fenley & Ricci Luyties
Lewis: Kanoa Leahey & Ryan Tsuji
Lewis: Kanoa Leahey & Ryan Tsuji
CSUN: Kanoa Leahey & Chris McLachlin
CSUN: Kanoa Leahey & Chris McLachlin
Long Beach State: Matt Brown & Matt Prosser
Long Beach State: Bryan Fenley & Mike Sealy
UC Santa Barbara: Kanoa Leahey & Chris McLachlin
UC Santa Barbara: Kanoa Leahey & Chris McLachlin
UC Irvine: Rob Espero & Charlie Brande 
UC Irvine: Rob Espero & Charlie Brande
Big West Tournament- UC Irvine: Kanoa Leahey & Chris McLachlin
Big West Championship- Long Beach State: Kanoa Leahey & Chris McLachlin

Rankings 

^The Media did not release a Pre-season poll.

References

2022 in sports in Hawaii
2022 NCAA Division I & II men's volleyball season
2022 Big West Conference men's volleyball season